Artur Geldymuratovich Rozyyev (born 25 October 1982) is a former Russian professional football player.

Club career
He played 5 seasons in the Russian Football National League for 4 different clubs.

References

1982 births
Sportspeople from Tashkent
Uzbekistani emigrants to Russia
Living people
Russian footballers
Association football midfielders
FC Dynamo Bryansk players
FC Ural Yekaterinburg players
FC SKA-Khabarovsk players
FC Chernomorets Novorossiysk players